Mateusz Mach (born April 15, 1997) is a Polish entrepreneur and investor. Founder of the world's first sign language messenger Five App and venture house Nextrope. Finalist of the ranking of the most influential European entrepreneurs under the age of thirty, Forbes 30 Under 30.

Education 
Mach graduated from high school III Liceum Ogólnokształcące im. Marynarki Wojennej RP in Gdynia, Poland with International Baccalaureate Diploma. Currently he studies Economics at NYU Abu Dhabi, a college within New York University. He also attended courses at New York University Leonard N. Stern School of Business.

Career 
In 2015, at the age of 17 Mateusz Mach debuted as an entrepreneur when he introduced the Five App start-up. The mobile application was the world's first sign language messenger, enabling deaf people to communicate efficiently using Android- and iOS-based devices. As a social impact project, the Five App was largely acclaimed among the targeted audience and acquired over ten thousands of users.

In 2017, Mach founded a venture house, Nextrope. The company focuses on delivering fintech software to institutional clients and governmental institutions. The firm aims at the decentralization of music industry by introducing Ethereum-backed utility tokens for users to purchase access to music streaming services. He launched the Initial Coin Offering (ICO) of OPUS in the Summer of 2017.

Achievements 
In 2017 Mach was ranked in the European edition of the Forbes 30 Under 30 Ranking, thanks to the success of Five App. Mateusz Mach is also the finalist of New Europe 100 List, a project founded by Google and Financial Times in order to distinguish the most innovative entrepreneurs in the region of Central and Eastern Europe.

References 

1997 births
Living people
Businesspeople from Gdańsk